The Diversisporaceae are a family of fungi in the order Diversisporales. These fungi form arbuscular mycorrhiza and vesicles in roots.

References

Diversisporales
Fungus families